The 83rd District of the Iowa House of Representatives in the state of Iowa.

Current elected officials
Martin Graber is the representative currently representing the district.

Past representatives
The district has previously been represented by:
 Wendell Pellett, 1971–1973
 Charles F. Strothman, 1973–1975
 Arnold R. Lindeen, 1975–1979
 Virgil E. Corey, 1979–1983
 Lyle R. Krewson, 1983–1985
 Janet Metcalf, 1985–1993
 Linda Nelson, 1993–1997
 Brad Hansen, 1997–2003
 Steven Olson, 2003–2013
 Jerry Kearns, 2013–2019
 Jeff Kurtz, 2019–2021
 Martin Graber, 2021–present

References

083